Kabutari (also Romanized as Kabūtarī) is a village in Abolfares Rural District, in the Central District of Ramhormoz County, Khuzestan Province, Iran. At the 2006 census, its population was 305, in 60 families.

References 

Populated places in Ramhormoz County